The 2004 Internationaux de Strasbourg was a tennis tournament played on outdoor clay courts. It was the 18st edition of the Internationaux de Strasbourg, and was part of the Tier III category of the 2004 WTA Tour. It took place at the Centre Sportif de Hautepierre in Strasbourg, France from 17 May until 22 May 2004. Unseeded Claudine Schaul won the singles title.

Finals

Singles

  Claudine Schaul defeated  Lindsay Davenport 2–6, 6–0, 6–3

Doubles

  Lisa McShea /  Milagros Sequera defeated  Tina Križan /  Katarina Srebotnik 6–4, 6–1

References

External links
 ITF tournament edition details 
 Tournament draws

Internationaux de Strasbourg
2004
Internationaux de Strasbourg
Internationaux de Strasbourg